Bill Dawson may refer to:

 William "Red" Dawson (born 1942), former American football player and assistant coach for Marshall University
 Bill Dawson (software engineer) (born 1958), software engineer and co-founder of Xoom
Bill Dawson (football trainer), coach with Stoke and Southampton in the late 19th century, see 1896–97 Southampton St. Mary's F.C. season

See also
 William Dawson (disambiguation)